Beep baseball is a form of baseball which can be played by people who are visually impaired, using a ball that beeps.

National Beep Baseball Association
The National Beep Baseball Association (NBBA) was organized in the United States in 1976 for adults with visual impairments to play baseball. Each year, the NBBA coordinates local, state, and regional tournaments, among them the Indy Invitational in Indianapolis, Indiana; the Bolingbrook Beep Ball Bash (one of the first tournaments to offer a cash award) outside Chicago, Illinois; in some cases, a round robin tournament in Columbus, Ohio; and, more recently, a round robin tournament in the Philadelphia area. In August of each year, the NBBA sponsors a national and international invitational tournament. The 2007 World Series, as the August invitational is known, was held for the first time in a city that hosts no beep baseball team, Rochester, Minnesota. More recently, the World Series has been held in Columbus, Ohio, in 2004; Houston, Texas, in 2005; and Cleveland, Ohio, in 2006. The World Series was held in Taiwan in 2000.

The 2018 World Series took place in Eau Claire, Wisconsin and the 2019 event is scheduled for Tulsa, Oklahoma.

Outside the United States
Beep baseball is said to have a "strong following" in France, Germany and Italy, and a taster event was organised at Farnham Park, England, in 2013 by BaseballSoftballUK.

Basic rules

Setup and equipment
Beep baseball is played on a grass field with six fielders (generally a first-baseman, third-baseman, shortstop, left fielder, right fielder, and center fielder, although two-four defensive sets are not unheard-of) and one or two "spotters" from one team, and the pitcher, catcher, and batter from the other team. Fielders and batter are blindfolded. There is also a D.H. and D.F. (designated fielder). They must be legally blind, in most cases. However, the NBBA has a rule that, if a team cannot field the minimum six batters required to fill its lineup card, it may opt to allow up to two sighted volunteers to blindfold themselves and play as the players with visual impairments do. Catcher, pitcher, and spotters do not wear blindfolds and are usually sighted, although there have been a few who are partially blind. The ball beeps and is a modified, oversized softball. They are each placed  from homeplate and are in the equivalent positions to first and third bases in regular baseball.

Run scoring
When the batter hits the ball, a base operator turns on one of the two bases (first or third) for the batter to run to. If the batter touches the base before a fielder can pick up the ball, the offensive team scores a run. It takes four strikes for a batter to be out. If the ball goes beyond the two base lines or doesn't travel at least , it is foul and counted as a strike, unless it is the potential fourth strike, in which case the count holds and the batter just swings again. If a batted ball travels at least  in the air over fair territory before settling, it is, upon declaration of the umpire, a home run. If the ball ceases to beep, or if it hits the pitcher, and becomes a "dead ball," the count is reset and the batter swings again. A dead ball must not be touched. If it is, it is said to be back in play and the out must be recorded.

Spotting
The spotter or spotters call out a number to signify which part of the field a ball is traveling toward. Generally, the middle of the outfield is labeled 6, and either side, left and right, is numbered from 1 to 5 in a mirroring pattern. The spotter must not say anything beyond the numbered region on the field, and two spotters cannot make a call on the same play. If either case occurs, the run scores. The fielders head toward that section and listen for where the ball is specifically, often diving to the ground to get it. When a fielder picks up the ball before the batter reaches the base, the batter is out. In the rare event that a fielder catches the ball in the air before it touches the ground or other items, the side is automatically retired and the next half-inning commences. The spotter must also watch to ensure that nobody collides.

Innings
Beep baseball generally has six innings. The extra innings rules used in Major League Baseball generally apply to beep baseball. If one team is up by twelve or more runs, the other team has the opportunity to have short innings in which the losing team bats every inning and the winning team fields. This is known as the twelve-run rule; when it occurs, one team is said to "twelve-run" another. If the other team makes up the difference, the team that had been winning gets back all their missed at-bats.

There are no age- or gender-based restrictions in beep baseball; people as old as 70 and as young as 12 have played.

Teams
Several teams (over 200 teams, example of close to 50 since 2008, both past and present, some renamed) are: 
 Arizona Sidewinders (Chandler, Arizona) 
 Atlanta Eclipse
 Athens Timberwolves
 Augusta Hammers
 Austin Blackhawks
 Austin Jr. Hawks
 Bay Area Microchips (San Jose, California)
 Bayou City Heat (Houston, Texas) 
 BCS Outlaws (Bryan/College Station, Texas)
 Boston Renegades
 Braille Bandits of Palm Beach County (West Palm Beach, Florida)
 Caribbean Hurricanes
 Chicago Comets
 Cleveland Scrappers
 Colorado Storm (Boulder, Colorado)
 Columbus Midnight Stars
 Columbus Vipers
 Daytona Bats
 Florida Flamingoes (Orlando, Florida)
 Indianapolis Thunder
 Iowa Reapers (Ames, Iowa)
 Kansas All-Stars (Kansas City, Kansas) 
 Lone Star Roadrunners (Fort Worth, Texas) 
 Long Island Bombers (Rockville Center/Farmingdale, New York)
 Los Angeles Bats
 Las Vegas 20/20
 SMURF AND BANKS (Bloomington, Minnesota)
 Minnesota Millers
 New Jersey Lightning
 New Jersey Titans
 New York Heroes (Colonie, New York)
 Oklahoma City Bombers 
 Pennsylvania Wolfpack (Philadelphia, Pennsylvania)
 Philly Fire
 Providence Power
 Rochester Redwings (recently renamed the Rochester Pioneers) (Rochester, New York)
 San Antonio Jets (San Antonio, Texas)
 St. Louis Firing Squad
 Seattle South King Sluggers
 Southern Cal. Guardians (Claremont, California)
 Southwest Slammers (Tucson, Arizona)
 Sports for the Blind Lion Pride (Spokane, Washington)
 Stockton Sting Rays
 Tacoma Tide
 Taiwan Homerun (Irvine, California)
 Toronto Blind Jays
 U.S.A. Legends
 Tyler Tigers
 West Coast Dawgs (Fresno, California)
 Wichita Sonics (now the Wichita Falcons)

See also
 Goalball
 Paralympic Games

References

External links
 NBBA official website

 Field of Beeps Multimedia story with video and audio of the Long Island Bombers.

 

Baseball genres
Blind sports
+
Parasports organizations in the United States